The Mercedes-Benz CLK GTR (chassis code C297) is a GT1 sports car built and produced by Mercedes-Benz in conjunction with their then motorsport partner AMG. Intended for racing in the new FIA GT Championship series in 1997, the CLK GTR was designed primarily as a race car, with the road cars necessary in order to meet homologation standards being secondary in the car's design, i.e. it was a homologation special.

Following its successful campaign in the 1997 FIA GT Championship, the race car was also entered in the first two rounds of the 1998 FIA GT Championship, before being replaced for the 1998 24 Hours of Le Mans. Its successor, the 1998 Mercedes-Benz CLK LM, would conclude Mercedes' GT1 program,  being replaced by the Mercedes-Benz CLR Le Mans Grand Touring Prototype (LMGTP), a purpose-built racecar that did not have to abide by the homologation rules of the previous GT1 cars.

Background 

Following the 1955 Le Mans disaster, Mercedes-Benz as a works outfit had withdrawn from all motorsport activities, including the upper echelons of sportscar racing. Mercedes gradually reintroduced itself to motorsport, returning to the top level of sportscar racing in 1985, first as an engine supplier to Sauber, later as a full-time works partner. Despite Mercedes winning the World Sportscar Championship twice in 1989 and 1990, they eventually withdrew at the end of 1991 following disappointing results.

However, Mercedes saw success elsewhere, with a burgeoning touring car program in the Deutsche Tourenwagen Meisterschaft, where the 190 E and its Evolution I and II siblings were climbing up the ranks. The 1991 season would see the 190 E Evo II take the honours in the constructors' championship. Klaus Ludwig piloted the car to the 1992 drivers' championship, with the 190 E being replaced by the W202 C-Class following the conclusion of the 1993 season. The C-Class went on to dominate both drivers and constructors championships from 1994 to 1996; as a result of the domination the Deutsche Tourenwagen Meisterschaft/International Touring Car Championship folded in late 1996, with both remaining competitors Opel and Alfa Romeo withdrawing due to the rising costs.

Without a top series to compete in, Mercedes-Benz looked towards the BPR Global GT Series, which had recently become an FIA-sanctioned championship, the FIA GT Championship, where Mercedes-Benz saw an opportunity to go against manufacturers such as Porsche and McLaren. The McLaren F1 GTR was the dominant car in this series, and in order to defeat it fellow German marque Porsche built a dedicated racecar to fight the McLarens. Porsche's challenger, the 911 GT1, became the first of the homologation specials, with Norbert Singer modifying a Porsche 962 chassis to accommodate the front fascia of a Porsche 993, leaving other things such as the suspension and engine largely intact. Only two units of the 993-based 911 GT1 were actually completed by the end of 1996. Seeing this, AMG was tasked by Mercedes-Benz with creating a car akin to the 911 GT1, an almost purebred racing machine with a resemblance to a road car. The CLK GTR was the end result, sharing nothing mechanically except the headlights, rear taillights and grille with the road-going Mercedes-Benz CLK.

The CLK GTR was developed in a mere 128 days, this development time hastened by the purchase of McLaren F1 GTR chassis #11R from then-reigning FIA GT Championship champions Larbre Compétition. The car served as AMG's mule, the F1's bodywork was replaced by AMG's own, and the BMW S70 engine replaced by Mercedes' own powerplant, a M120 V12. The car was eventually restored to its original mechanical condition, and was auctioned off in Monaco in 2000 by RM Sotheby's to a British owner.

Specifications
The chassis of the CLK GTR was a carbon-fibre monocoque mated to an aluminium honeycomb frame, constructed by Lola Composites, a division of Lola Cars. The engine was a derivative of the M120 engine found in the R129 SL-Class and W140 S-Class, retitled the LS600, or GT 112. The engine (which also served as a stressed member) was mounted amidships behind the driver, with power being sent to the rear wheels via a 6-speed sequential manual transmission, giving the car a  time of 3.8 seconds. Several driving aids such as traction control, ABS, active suspension, drive by wire throttle control, were banned, with fore-aft brake bias the only aid allowed. The front and rear suspension were identical, consisting of double wishbones, with pull-rod actuated coil springs with adjustable shocks.

Racing history
The CLK GTR debuted at Mercedes' home track, the Hockenheimring, at the 1997 FIA GT Hockenheim 4 Hours. Bernd Schneider qualified on pole and took the fastest lap, but had to retire due to braking problems. The sister No. 10 CLK GTR only mustered a 27th place finish, also battling mechanical woes. Still, the pace of the car was promising, and after intense development over the summer break, Mercedes would score their first 1-2 finish at the 1997 FIA GT Nürburgring 4 Hours with Schneider and Klaus Ludwig taking the win.

The rest of the season saw the CLK GTR take three more 1-2 finishes, and wins at the 1997 FIA GT Sebring 3 Hours and 1997 FIA GT Laguna Seca 3 Hours would secure Mercedes the constructors' and drivers' championship with Schneider in their maiden season. Mercedes opted not to enter that year's 24 Hours of Le Mans, as AMG understood that the V12 in the CLK GTR was better tailored to the 4-hour sprints of the FIA GT Championship rather than the 24-hour gruel of the Circuit de la Sarthe. Instead, Mercedes and AMG decided to develop a bespoke car for next year's 24 Hours of Le Mans, an evolution of the CLK GTR dubbed the CLK LM, LM for Le Mans.

Straßenversion 

The road-legal homologated version of the CLK-GTR would simply gain the suffix Straßenversion, German for Street version. In a similar fashion to the Porsche 911 GT1 in 1996, only a singular road car was completed in 1997 and was shown in that year's Frankfurt Motor Show. The rest of the road cars were built at Affalterbach by AMG in collaboration with HWA over 1998, and production ceased in mid-1999. Many components of the road car were lifted directly from the racecar, including the suspension, the sequential transmission, and the carbon-fibre monocoque. Of the 28 produced, 2 were prototypes, 6 were roadsters, and 20 were coupés, 2 of which left the factory in "SuperSport" specification. Two cars, one coupé and one roadster, also left the factory as right-hand drive for the 29th Sultan of Brunei, Hassanal Bolkiah.

Former racing driver and motoring journalist Paul Frère test drove the CLK GTR around the Hockenheimring. Writing for Road & Track magazine, he praised the car's , despite its immense power. He also applauded the effort put in by Mercedes-Benz to make the car more user-friendly, including large amounts of soundproofing to reduce the mechanical noise from the transmission and engine, although critiqued the cramped cockpit space despite the large width of the car, and its driveability in city conditions, due to its non-synchronous transmission and large amount of torque available from low RPM. He ended his review describing the car as a "real work of art".

Specifications
Sending this power to the rear wheels was a 6-speed sequential manual transmission with a four-plate carbon fibre clutch. The 18-inch centrelocking wheels were shod in 295/35ZR18 Bridgestone tyres at the front and 345/35ZR18 at the rear.

The road car received several amenities such as ABS, air-conditioning and an audio system. Bins for luggage were located under each door, as was the control for the fire suppression system on the driver side. Owners had the option of fitting their seats with tartan, leather, or Alcantara, with four-point harnesses for safety. Like the race car, the CLK GTR only shared the headlights, taillights and grille with the roadgoing CLK, and many exterior design elements such as the roof-mounted air dams, and NACA ducts on the sills were retained. Mercedes decided not to modify the CLK GTR to comply with United States safety regulations, and all examples imported to the U.S were under Show or Display exemptions.

Roadster

When the first production run of 20 CLK GTR coupés ended in 1999, one roadster was also produced and held onto by AMG until 2002, when it was purchased by Mark Johnston. Johnston attempted to sue DaimlerChrysler in 2006, claiming that when he had taken it for a test drive with a customer, the oil gauge lit up and the transmission promptly failed. The next five would be converted from coupés to roadsters based on existing GTR chassis by HWA, and were made available in 2006.

Modifications to the coupé included moving the engine intake from the roof to the sides, door-mounted mirrors, an integrated rollbar behind the seats, a revised front grille and rear wing which resembled the fixed rear wing of the race cars. Of the six roadsters built, one was painted black and sold in 2015 by Bonhams, and now resides at Dutton Garage in Melbourne. Another was painted dark silver with a purple interior, for the Sultan of Brunei, and was sold to Indian businessman Vijay Mallya in 2009.

SuperSport
Two chassis would also leave the AMG factory in SuperSport specification. The original  E69 engined was superseded with the larger, more powerful  E73 M297, the same engine found in the Pagani Zonda and Mercedes-Benz R129, producing  @ 6,500 rpm and  @ 5,250 rpm.

Legacy
At the time of manufacture, Guinness World Records named the CLK Straßenversion and its siblings the world's most expensive production car, retailing for US$1,547,620 ($ in 2021). This record stood until the introduction of the Ferrari FXX-K in 2015.

Along with its GT1 siblings, the Porsche 911 GT1 and McLaren F1 GTR, the trio were known as the "holy trinity" of Group GT1, and formed what several publications deemed a "golden era" or "pinnacle" of 90s sportscar racing.

Racing results

Complete FIA GT Championship results
(key) Races in bold indicates pole position. Races in italics indicates fastest lap.

See also
 Mercedes-Benz in motorsport

References

External links
 Carfection, Mercedes CLK GTR: The ULTIMATE Group Test Part 3  Carfection 4K, YouTube, 22 May 2021. A video review of the CLK GTR in conjunction with the Porsche 911 GT1 and McLaren F1.
 Simanaitis, Dennis; Millen, Steve, Driving the Championship Winning Mercedes-Benz CLK-GTR, Road & Track. Vol. 50, no. 3. November 1998. A review of the CLK GTR racecar.
 Rusz, Joe, Mercedes CLK-GTR: Lose weight fast!, Road & Track. Vol. 49, no. 6. February 1998. Joe Rusz goes along for a ride in the CLK-GTR racecar along with 1997 FIA GT Champion Bernd Schneider.

CLK-GTR
Sports cars
Grand tourer racing cars
Rear mid-engine, rear-wheel-drive vehicles
Cars introduced in 1997